Patna Book Fair or Patna Pustak Mela is an annual book fair organized in Patna, India by the Centre for Readership Development (CRD),held annually (usually in the first week of December) at the Gandhi Maidan, selling and exhibiting books, printed matter, stationery, printing, compact discs and other multimedia publishing.
The First Patna Book Fair was held in 1985 and the last event was held in November 2022 was its 26th edition. During 1999-2002 the venue was shifted to Patliputra colony grounds. Next edition of 27th Patna Book Fair is going to be held between 2nd-13th December 2022 at Gandhi Maidan. The event could not be held due to the Corona Pandemic and is being organised after 2019.

Such is its stature that national dailies and electronic media provide wide coverage to the event not just on state level, but on national level. Celebrities from art and culture, authors, writers and thinkers come to the Fair and participate in seminars, symposiums talks and debates that are conducted by us for the benefit of the visitors.  In effect, the Patna Book Fair serves as a melting pot of ideas, cultures, beliefs and trends in literary writings and lifestyle..

References

Book fairs in India
Culture of Patna